The Thriller jacket is the red jacket worn by Michael Jackson in the 1983 "Thriller" music video. Designed by Deborah Nadoolman Landis, the candy-apple-red jacket featured black stripes and raised shoulders forming an inverted triangle. The jacket became the "hottest outerwear fad of the mid-1980s" and was widely emulated. Because counterfeit copies of the jacket could sell at over $500, in 1984 Jackson filed a lawsuit in New York City to prevent unauthorized copies of the jacket and his other merchandise.

On 27 June 2011, the jacket sold for $1.8 million at Julien's Auctions. The buyer, Milton Verret, described the jacket as "the greatest piece of rock and roll memorabilia in history". The proceeds from the jacket were donated to the Shambala Animal Kingdom, where Jackson's Bengal tigers were housed when he left Neverland Ranch in 2006.

Design

The jacket was designed by Deborah Nadoolman Landis. She had also designed Indiana Jones' jacket in Raiders of the Lost Ark, among other things. The red jacket was noted for its V shaped black stripes, the unusual style of the front buttons, and the angular, rigid shoulders protruding out over the tops of the arms. Landis stated that she specifically designed the jacket to help Jackson appear more "virile".

Fashion designer Zaldy was responsible for a redesigned version of the jacket for the cancelled This Is It concerts. It had an imitation of blood on its shoulders, and on the inside a stamp resembling the feline beast Jackson turns into in the video.

Reception
The jacket became the "hottest outerwear fad of the mid-1980s" and was widely emulated. It is sometimes emulated by celebrities today such as Chris Brown and Kanye West. It also became one of the most sought after by many people and the epitome of the 1980s teen cool. The jacket he wore in the Thriller video, along with a copy of the black and white leather jacket he wore in one of the Pepsi commercials and in the dance rehearsal portions behinds the scenes of The Making of Michael Jackson's Thriller, are among his best-selling jackets. Expensive counterfeits were mass-produced and often sold for over $500 to people thinking they were getting the real thing. Because of this mass counterfeiting and the profits it earned, in 1984 Jackson filed a lawsuit in New York City to prevent unauthorized copies of the jacket and his other merchandise.

Leaving Neverland
In the 2019 documentary Leaving Neverland, choreographer Wade Robson, who claims Jackson sexually abused him, burns Jackson memorabilia including a Thriller jacket. Director Dan Reed said that the jacket was genuine, but Robson claimed that it was custom-made for his childhood performances. According to auction house Julien's Auctions, in 2011 Robson sold a jacket from "Thriller" for $49,920. The actual jacket was owned by the Verret family in Austin, Texas, and was added temporarily to the Rock & Roll Hall of Fame in Cleveland, Ohio, in May, 2022, under "high security" surveillance.

References

1980s fashion
1983 clothing
Individual jackets
Thriller Jacket
1980s fads and trends